Vice-Admiral The Honourable Edmund Rupert Drummond CB MVO DL (8 May 1884 – 9 September 1965) was a Royal Navy officer who became Commander-in-Chief of the New Zealand Division.

Naval career
Born the son of James Drummond, 10th Viscount Strathallan, and educated at the Royal Naval College Dartmouth, Drummond was promoted to lieutenant in 1906. He served in World War I as second in command of the cruiser HMS Caroline from 1914 and then as an officer in the cruiser HMS Cardiff from 1917. He was appointed Commanding Officer of the cruiser HMS Capetown in 1927, Chief of Staff to the Commander-in-Chief, Portsmouth in 1930 and Chief of Staff to the Commander-in-Chief American and West Indies Station before becoming Commander-in-Chief of the New Zealand Division in 1935. He served in World War II as Captain of the Dockyard at Portland from August 1939 and as Chief of Staff to the Commander-in-Chief, Rosyth from 1942 until September 1945 when he retired.

In retirement he lived at Stornoway on the Isle of Lewis and was Deputy Lieutenant of Ross and Cromarty.

Family
In 1910 he married Evelyn Frances Butler, daughter of James Butler, 4th Marquess of Ormonde.

References

1884 births
1965 deaths
Royal Navy vice admirals
Companions of the Order of the Bath
Members of the Royal Victorian Order